Vered Cohen (born 23 May 1988) is an Israeli footballer who plays as a midfielder and has appeared for the Israel women's national team.

Career
Cohen has been capped for the Israel national team, appearing for the team during the UEFA Women's Euro 2021 qualifying cycle.

References

External links
 
 
 

1988 births
Living people
Israeli women's footballers
Israel women's international footballers
Women's association football midfielders
Israeli Jews
Footballers from Rishon LeZion